Lamphun may refer to
the town Lamphun
Lamphun Province
Mueang Lamphun district
Lamphun district, the present-day Ban Na San district, Surat Thani Province